Helen Grace (born 20 August 1971, in Hertfordshire) is an English actress. She played the incestuous Georgia Simpson on the Channel 4 soap Brookside.

Biography and Career
Born Helen Victoria Scragg, she grew up as an only child in Northwood and attended St. Helen's School. She later trained to be an actress at the Drama Centre London, now part of the University of the Arts, London. Her career began in 1996 with her role on Brookside as Georgia Simpson, who was in an incestuous relationship with her younger brother. The storyline attracted considerable press attention at the time. She said that she undertook this role "for the experience" and as a springboard for her career more than for celebrity and was less than pleased with some of the early attention she received. However, she won praise for her handling of the role, and at the beginning of 1997, appeared alongside fellow soap stars of the day Patsy Palmer and Tracy Shaw in a Vogue magazine issue celebrating the British woman.

Upon leaving Brookside, she appeared in two series (1998 and 1999) of Roger Roger, a BBC1 sitcom penned by John Sullivan, set in a London minicab firm. She has also made numerous TV guest appearances, including the Jane Wilkinson in "Lord Edgware Dies", Bad Girls, Cold Feet, Midsomer Murders, Filth: The Mary Whitehouse Story and Lewis.

On stage, she appeared as the wife of Gregor Antonescu (played by David Suchet) in a revival of Terence Rattigan's Man and Boy at the Duchess Theatre, London. She has also appeared in Tennessee Williams' The Glass Menagerie at the Theatre Royal York (November 1999) alongside Honor Blackman, and in Don Taylor's The Road To The Sea at the Orange Tree Theatre, Richmond (2003). During 2007–2008, she played the role of Marjorie Houseman (Baby's mother) in the stage version of Dirty Dancing at the Aldwych Theatre in London's West End.

Her film work includes Hello Friend, in which she plays the wife of a man whose life is blighted by a piece of demonic computer software. The film, written by IT Crowd creator Graham Linehan, is included in the extras on the IT Crowd Series 1 DVD, and features cameo appearances by Richard Ayoade and Julia Davis.

She joined British soap opera Hollyoaks in 2012, making her first appearance on 13 July as Elizabeth Morrison, mother of already established character Maddie Morrison (Scarlett Bowman) and wife of Ed Morrison (Dominic Rickhards).

Personal life
Grace is married, with two children. Her husband is actor Timothy Watson.

References

External links
 
 https://www.facebook.com/Helen-Grace-1172926566050776/
 https://www.youtube.com/channel/UCUg_4nZyugeOds9MXQqFMvQ
 CV at Gavin Barker Associates

English stage actresses
English television actresses
English soap opera actresses
Alumni of Durham University
1971 births
Living people
People educated at St Helen's School
Alumni of the Drama Centre London
Actresses from Hertfordshire